San Felice a Cancello is a comune (municipality) in the Province of Caserta in the Italian region Campania, located about  northeast of Naples and about  southeast of Caserta.

It has a mostly agricultural economy.

References

External links
 Official website

Cities and towns in Campania